The FMW World Street Fight 8-Man Tag Team Championship is a championship in Frontier Martial-Arts Wrestling. It replaced the FMW World Street Fight 6-Man Tag Team Championship in October 2016. The first champions were determined on November 24, 2016, at Korakuen Hall in Tokyo.

Title history

References

Hardcore wrestling championships
Tag team wrestling championships
Frontier Martial-Arts Wrestling championships